Ragi Flour is a primarily a powder food, made out of Ragi grain. It is finger millet powder. It has high protein and mineral content. It is an ideal source of protein for vegetarians. Ragi flour has a low-fat content along with the rich amount of fibres adds to the already long list of ragi flour benefits.

Preparation of Ragi  flour 
First Ragi is graded and washed. It is allowed to dry naturally in sunlight for 5 to 8 hours. It is then powdered. It is great for people with low hemoglobin levels. Ragi porridge, ragi halwa, ragi ela ada, ragi kozhukatta can be made with Ragi flour which is rich in taste and nutrients.

Baking

All purpose flour can be replaced with Ragi flour during baking which carries whole lot of nutritional benefits. Ragi cake and Ragi biscuits can be prepared. Ragi flour based bakery products and instant mixes are in demand now.

References 

South Indian cuisine
Flour
Baking